Gustave Samuel James de Rothschild, Baron de Rothschild  (17 February 1829 in Paris – 28 November 1911 in Paris) was a French banker and scion of the French branch of the Rothschild family. He was the second son of James Mayer de Rothschild and Betty Salomon von Rothschild (of the German branch of the same family).

In accordance with Rothschild tradition, Gustave was expected to marry a cousin, and his family hoped that he would propose to one of his cousins Mathilde von Rothschild or Evelina de Rothschild. Instead, in 1859 Gustave married Cécile Anspach, the daughter of a high official in the Court of Cassation, and they had six children:
 Octave de Rothschild (1860–1860);
 Zoé Lucie Betty de Rothschild (1863–1916), married in 1882 the Belgian banker Léon Lambert;
 Aline Caroline de Rothschild (1867–1909), married in 1887 Sir Edward Albert Sassoon (1856–1912);
 Bertha Juliette de Rothschild (1870–1896);
 André de Rothschild (1874–1877);
 Robert de Rothschild (1880–1946).

He was rumored to be the lover of Marguerite Durand, publisher of La Fronde.

He built the Château de Laversine in Saint-Maximin near Chantilly.

References

External links

French bankers
19th-century French Jews
Gustave
1829 births
1911 deaths
Jewish philanthropists
Jewish bankers